The AR 289 Bridge Over English Creek is a historic bridge in rural eastern Fulton County, Arkansas. The bridge, a single-span steel Pratt through-truss structure, carries Arkansas Highway 289 over English Creek south of Mammoth Spring. Built in 1929 by the Virginia Bridge and Iron Company, it is important as a well-preserved example of its type in Fulton County, and for its historical role in transportation in the region.

The bridge was listed on the National Register of Historic Places in 2009, and was delisted in 2022.

See also
National Register of Historic Places listings in Fulton County, Arkansas
List of bridges on the National Register of Historic Places in Arkansas

References

Road bridges on the National Register of Historic Places in Arkansas
Bridges completed in 1929
National Register of Historic Places in Fulton County, Arkansas
Steel bridges in the United States
Transportation in Fulton County, Arkansas
1929 establishments in Arkansas